Football Club Andijan, also known as FC Andijan, is an Uzbek football club based in Andijan. The club plays in Uzbekistan Super League.

History
The club was formed 1964 under the name Spartak. In 1969 the club was renamed Andijanez. After 1990 the club played in Uzbek League as Navruz Andijan. Since 1997 the club has played as FK Andijan. In 1964–70, 1973–74 and 1986–91 the club played in Soviet League championships.

On 22 August 2012 club hired Azamat Abduraimov as head coach to help Andijan remain in the top division, however the club was relegated to the Uzbekistan First League. The club finished as 2013 season runners-up after Mash'al Mubarek and gained promotion to Uzbek League after a single year in the First League. After the first half of the 2013 season, Andijon was 14th in the league with only 4 points. On 14 June 2014 Andijan lost an away match against Bunyodkor by 1–2. Some days later, on 20 June 2014 Azamat Abduraimov resigned. Orif Mamatkazin, as the interim of the club, was appointed as caretaker. On 26 September 2014 Edgar Gess was appointed as the club's new head coach.

Club names 
1964–67: Spartak
1969–74: Andijanez
1983–85: Tekstilshhik
1986–88: Pakhtakor
1989–90: Spartak
1991–96: Navruz
1997: FK Andijan
2006: Andijan UzDaewoo Auto
2008: FC Andijan (Eagles)

Domestic history

Players

Current squad

Youth squad

Personnel

Current technical staff

Honours
Uzbekistan First League (1):
2005
Uzbekistan First League Runners-up:
2013

Managers

 Aleksandr Averyanov (1986–87)
 Berador Abduraimov (1989)
 Igor Frolov (1989)
 Aleksei Petrushin (1990)
 Karim Muminov (1992)
 Serhiy Shevchenko (1997–99)
 Khakim Fuzailov (2003)
 Edgar Gess (2006–07)
 Ishtvan Sekech (2007)
 Orif Mamatkazin (2007–09)
 Amet Memet (2010)
 Orif Mamatkazin (2011)
 Aleksandr Averyanov (Dec 2011 – Aug 2012)
 Azamat Abduraimov (Aug 2012 – June 2014)
 Orif Mamatkazin (interim) (June 2014 – July 2014)
 Serhiy Shevchenko (2014–1?)
 Edgar Gess (Sept 2014– 28 August 2015)
 Sergey Kovshov (2 September 2015– 30 January 2016)
 Bakhtiyor Ashurmatov (30 January 2016– 14 June 2016)
 Orif Mamatkazin (14 June 2016– )
 Ildar Sakaev   (2018-2019- )
 Aleksandr Khomyakov (2019 June 2020 March-)
 Viktor Kumykov (2020 May-...)

References

External links
 Official website
 Official Telegram channel
 http://telegram.me/fcandijan 
 T FK Andijan – Weltfussballarchiv  
 FK Andijan -UzPFL
 FK Andijan – soccerway

Andijan
Association football clubs established in 1964
1964 establishments in Uzbekistan
Andijan